A hippogonal (pronounced ) chess move is one similar to a knight's move.  That is, a leap m squares in one of the orthogonal directions, and n squares in the other, for integer values of m and n. It need not be a 2:1 ratio for m and n.  A specific type of hippogonal move can be written (m,n), usually with the smaller number first.

For example, the knight itself moves two squares in one orthogonal direction and one in the other—it moves hippogonally. It is a (1,2) hippogonal mover, sometimes referred to as a (1,2) leaper.

Other hippogonally moving pieces include the camel, a fairy chess piece, which moves three squares in one direction and one in the other, and thus is a (1,3) hippogonal mover. The  Xiangqi horse is a hippogonal stepper and the nightrider is a hippogonal rider.

The pieces are colourbound if the sum of m and n is even, and change colour with every move otherwise.

Etymology 

References

External links 
 Piececlopedia: Knight by Fergus Duniho and Hans Bodlaender, The Chess Variant Pages 

Fairy chess pieces
Chess terminology